The John Franklin Cobb House, also known as the Cobb Plantation, is a historic house in rural Cherokee County, North Carolina.  The oldest portion of the house is a log structure built in 1863, making it one of the few surviving pre-Civil War structures in the county.  It is also notable as a place frequented by baseball legend Ty Cobb in his childhood; he was a grandson of the original builder, John Franklin Cobb.  The house is, outside of the log cabin at its core, a rambling structure consisting of a variety of additions to the original log cabin.  The house has been enclosed in weatherboarding since the 1880s.  It was for many years the center of a farm of some 150-200 acres, and was in the Cobb family until 1977.

The house, as well as outbuildings on a roughly six-acre parcel, were listed on the National Register of Historic Places in 1984.  The house is located about two tenths of a mile down a private drive, west of US Route 129-19, about seven-tenths of a mile south of its junction with SR 1583.

See also
National Register of Historic Places listings in Cherokee County, North Carolina

References

Houses on the National Register of Historic Places in North Carolina
Houses completed in 1863
Houses in Cherokee County, North Carolina
National Register of Historic Places in Cherokee County, North Carolina
1863 establishments in North Carolina